IC codes (identity code) or 6+1 codes are codes used by the British police in radio communications and crime recording systems to describe the apparent ethnicity of a suspect or victim. Originating in the late 1970s, the codes are based on a police officer's perceived view of an individual's ethnicity based on a visual assessment, as opposed to that individual's self-definition. In most circumstances where an individual's ethnicity is recorded after spoken contact with police (such as a "stop and search" or arrest), in addition to visual assessment police are also required to use the more extensive "16+1" self defined ethnicity codes, "even if the category chosen is clearly at odds with the officer’s visual assessment".

The usage of IC codes in relation to individuals is recorded as part of information collected during activities including "stop and search", issuing of fixed penalties, arrest, and custody of individuals, and is recorded on a number of police databases. This is as required under section 95 of the Criminal Justice Act 1991, which states that:

The IC codes are also known as PNC or Phoenix Codes, or the 6+1 system. Other individuals involved in security and law enforcement, such as environmental enforcement officers, street wardens, guardians (Cheltenham), city guardians (Broad Street, Westminster City Council), police community support officers, revenue protection inspectors, security guards and door supervisors, also use IC codes on a regular basis.

Other uses
The IC classification has also been used in scientific research. In 2014, a global forensic database based on the IC codes was established. It contains the microsatellite (short tandem repeat) profiles of 7,121 individuals from various parts of the world residing or applying to live in the UK and Ireland. The six population database is used in a forensic setting to ascertain distant relatedness or coancestry according to the fixation index (FST) measure of genetic distance.

See also
Classification of ethnicity in the United Kingdom

References

Encodings
Law enforcement in the United Kingdom